Ross Lake is a lake in Crow Wing County, in the U.S. state of Minnesota, covering 491 acres.

Ross Lake was named for an early lumberman.

See also
List of lakes in Minnesota

References

Lakes of Minnesota
Lakes of Crow Wing County, Minnesota